Saskatoon is the largest city in Saskatchewan, Canada. Upon completion it became the tallest building in the province, replacing Regina’s Mosaic Tower. The second-tallest is the 24-storey,  La Renaissance Apartments.

, there were only 4 high-rises under construction, approved for construction, or proposed for construction in Saskatoon.

The Saskatoon skyline can be photographed from various angles; since the Delta Bessborough is one of the most distinct buildings it is common to photograph the skyline from the east shore of the South Saskatchewan River centered on the Bessborough.

Buildings 

This includes spires and architectural details but does not include antenna masts.

Timeline of tallest buildings

Tallest under construction, approved, proposed, and cancelled 

This lists skyscrapers that are under construction, approved or proposed in Saskatoon, but are not yet completed structures.

See also

 Canadian Centre for Architecture
 Society of Architectural Historians
 Canadian architecture
 List of tallest buildings in Canada
 List of tallest buildings in Regina
 List of tallest buildings in Winnipeg

References

External links 
 Emporis.com
 Skyscraperpage.com

 
Saskatoon
Tallest buildings in Saskatoon